"Un'emergenza d'amore" (English: A love emergency) is a pop song recorded by Italian singer Laura Pausini for her album La mia risposta and released as the set's first single on 11 September 1998. "Emergencia de amor" is its Spanish-language version, adapted by Pausini herself with Carlos Pixin and León Tristán.

Track listing
CD single – Germany
"Un'emergenza d'amore" (Radio Edit) – 3:50
"Un'emergenza d'amore" (Instrumental) – 4:29

CD single – Italy
"Un'emergenza d'amore" (Radio Edit) – 3:50
"Un'emergenza d'amore" (Instrumental) – 4:29
"Ascolta il tuo cuore" – 4:58
"Angeles en el cielo" – 5:15

Promo CD single – Germany
"Un'emergenza d'amore" (Radio Edit) – 3:50
 
CD single – Mexico
"Emergencia de amor" (Radio Edit) – 3:50

Charts

References

Laura Pausini songs
Songs written by Cheope
Songs written by Laura Pausini
1998 songs